The 1993 Jade Solid Gold Best Ten Music Awards Presentation was held in January 1994. It is part of the Jade Solid Gold Best Ten Music Awards Presentation series held in Hong Kong.

Top 10 song awards
The top 10 songs of 1993 are as follows.

Additional awards

References
 Top ten songs award 1993, Tvcity.tvb.com
 Additional awards 1993, Tvcity.tvb.com

Jade Solid Gold Best Ten Music Awards Presentation, 1993